Wilhelm Weistand (born 8 September 1945) is a Polish hurdler. He competed in the men's 400 metres hurdles at the 1968 Summer Olympics.

References

1945 births
Living people
Athletes (track and field) at the 1968 Summer Olympics
Polish male hurdlers
Olympic athletes of Poland
Place of birth missing (living people)
20th-century Polish people